Microsynotaxus is a genus of Australian araneomorph spiders in the family Physoglenidae that was first described by J. Wunderlich in 2008.  it contains two species, both found in Queensland: M. calliope and M. insolens.

See also
 List of Physoglenidae species

References

Araneomorphae genera
Physoglenidae
Spiders of Australia